Robert Joseph Murphy, Jr. (born February 14, 1943) is an American professional golfer who was formerly a member of the PGA Tour and currently plays on the Champions Tour. Murphy has won 21 tournaments as a professional.

Early years
Murphy was born in Brooklyn, New York.  He was a standout pitcher in his youth, and as a teen led his high school baseball team to the state championship in 1960.  After suffering a football injury (which also ended his baseball career), Murphy got started in golf.

College career
Murphy attended the University of Florida in Gainesville, Florida, where he was a member of Sigma Alpha Epsilon Fraternity (Florida Upsilon Chapter).  While he was an undergraduate, he played for coach Buster Bishop's Florida Gators men's golf team in National Collegiate Athletic Association (NCAA) competition from 1964 to 1966.  While he was a college student, he won the 1965 U.S. Amateur and the 1966 individual NCAA championship, and was recognized as an All-American in 1966.  He graduated from the University of Florida with a bachelor's degree in health and human performance in 1966, and was later inducted into the University of Florida Athletic Hall of Fame as a "Gator Great" in 1971.

Professional career
Murphy turned professional in 1967, and won five tournaments on the PGA Tour.  He was a member of the victorious U.S. team in the 1975 Ryder Cup competition.  His best finish in a major tournament was a second-place tie at the 1970 PGA Championship.  Murphy won 11 times on the Senior PGA Tour (now the Champions Tour).

Murphy first got into broadcasting while still playing. He joined CBS Sports as a tower announcer in 1984, working for CBS through 1991. He then joined ESPN as a color commentator, where he stayed through 1994. After a break from TV to play on the Senior PGA Tour, he joined NBC Sports in November 1999, and was a tower announcer for the PGA Tour on NBC through 2009, at which point he retired.

He was inducted into the Florida Sports Hall of Fame in 2011.

Personal life
Murphy lives in Delray Beach, Florida with his wife, Gail.

Amateur wins (2)
1965 U.S. Amateur
1966 NCAA championship (individual)

Professional wins (23)

PGA Tour wins (5)

PGA Tour playoff record (1–5)

Australian wins (1)
1972 Wills Masters

Other wins (3)
1967 Florida Open
1979 Jerry Ford Invitational
1980 South Florida PGA Championship

Senior PGA Tour wins (11)

*Note: Tournament shortened to 36 holes due to weather.

Senior PGA Tour playoff record (2–1)

Other senior wins (3)
1995 Diners Club Matches (with Jim Colbert)
1996 Diners Club Matches (with Jim Colbert)
2013 Liberty Mutual Insurance Legends of Golf - Demaret Division (with Jim Colbert)

Results in major championships

LA = Low amateur
CUT = missed the half-way cut
"T" indicates a tie for a place

Summary

Most consecutive cuts made – 11 (1971 PGA – 1976 Masters)
Longest streak of top-10s – 1 (three times)

Results in The Players Championship

CUT = missed the halfway cut
"T" indicates a tie for a place

U.S. national team appearances
Amateur
Walker Cup: 1967 (winners)
Eisenhower Trophy: 1966

Professional
Ryder Cup: 1975 (winners)

See also 

1967 PGA Tour Qualifying School graduates
List of American Ryder Cup golfers
List of Florida Gators men's golfers on the PGA Tour
List of golfers with most PGA Tour Champions wins
List of Sigma Alpha Epsilon members
List of University of Florida alumni
List of University of Florida Athletic Hall of Fame members

References

External links

American male golfers
Florida Gators men's golfers
PGA Tour golfers
PGA Tour Champions golfers
Ryder Cup competitors for the United States
Golf writers and broadcasters
Golfers from New York (state)
Golfers from Florida
Mulberry High School (Mulberry, Florida) alumni
Sportspeople from Brooklyn
Sportspeople from Delray Beach, Florida
1943 births
Living people